Wuppertal-Sonnborn station is located in the city of Wuppertal in the German state of North Rhine-Westphalia. It is on the Düsseldorf–Elberfeld line and is classified by Deutsche Bahn as a category 4 station.

The station is served by S 8 services running between Mönchengladbach Hauptbahnhof and Hagen Hauptbahnhof every 20 mins (two out of three starting/ending at Wuppertal-Oberbarmen) and by line S 9 running between Gladbeck and Wuppertal Hbf every 30 minutes (half extended to Recklinghausen / Haltern am See and to Hagen). It is also served by bus route 629, operated by WSW mobil at 30 or 60 minute intervals during the day.

References

Rhine-Ruhr S-Bahn stations
S9 (Rhine-Ruhr S-Bahn)
S8 (Rhine-Ruhr S-Bahn)
Railway stations in Wuppertal
Railway stations in Germany opened in 1870